Kfar Azar is a moshav ovdim located in the Ono Valley in central Israel. Previously part of Ef'al Regional Council, in 2007 it was transferred to the municipality of Ramat Gan together with Ramat Ef'al.

The moshav was established in December 1932 by two pioneer groups, Brenner and Ma'ash. Land was purchased adjacent to the Arab village al-Khayriyya, and was later supplemented by more land bought by the Jewish National Fund. The name "Azar" was given to the moshav as an acronym for Alexander Ziskind Rabinovitz, a Jewish Russian writer.

The population at the end of 1951 was 375.

Notable people
Yoram Tsafrir, archaeologist

References

Populated places established in 1932
Moshavim
Ramat Gan